"Soliloquy" is a 1945 song composed by Rogers, with lyrics by Oscar Hammerstein II, written for their 1945 musical Carousel, where it was introduced by John Raitt.  Gordon MacRae performs the song in the 1956 film version.

The now jobless carousel barker Billy Bigelow, the antihero of the musical, sings this seven-and-a-half-minute song just after he has learned he is about to become a father.  In it, he happily daydreams over what it would be like to be a father to a boy, but midway through the song, he realizes that it could turn out to be a girl.  The song immediately becomes more tender, as he begins to like the idea.  At song's end, he considers that a girl needs the very best a father can offer, and decides to get money to provide for her.  It is this idea that spurs him on to help his criminal pal Jigger Craigin in committing a robbery, an act which ultimately leads to personal disaster for Billy.

Frank Sinatra had recently become a father when he recorded "Soliloquy" for the first time on May 28, 1946.  With the time limitation of about 3:30 on a 10-inch 78 rpm record, his 7:57-long recording was released on Columbia's Masterwork label (the classical division) as two sides of a 12-inch record.

The song is extremely unusual in that it requires the singer to sing solo (and occasionally speak) for a full seven and a half minutes, in the manner of an operatic aria, without the benefit of an accompanying choral group "taking up the slack", as is usually the case in long musical numbers (e.g. "Ol' Man River").  The lengthy song "Glitter and Be Gay", from Leonard Bernstein's Candide, makes a similar requirement of the soprano performing it.

Notable recordings
Cast and studio albums feature John Raitt, Robert Goulet, Robert Merrill, Gordon MacRae, Alfred Drake, Michael Hayden and Samuel Ramey as Billy.  Other recordings include the following:
 Frank Sinatra - The Concert Sinatra (1963), A Man And His Music (1965), Sinatra 80th: Live in Concert (1995)
 Sammy Davis Jr. - Mr. Entertainment (1961)
 Anthony Warlow - Centre Stage
 Mandy Patinkin - Mandy Patinkin
 Thomas Hampson - Leading Man: The Best of Broadway
 James Barbour - Broadway in Concert (2007)
 Bryn Terfel - Something Wonderful (1996)
 Brian Stokes Mitchell - "Simply Broadway" (2012)
 Glen Campbell - Live at the Royal Festival Hall (SWBC-11707) (1977)
 Joshua Henry - "Carousel" on Broadway (2018)

Other references
The song is featured in Season 1 Episode 7 of Only Murders in the Building.

Songs from Rodgers and Hammerstein musicals
Frank Sinatra songs
1945 songs
Songs with music by Richard Rodgers
Songs with lyrics by Oscar Hammerstein II